The Development Bank of Wales (branded as simply Banc) is a Welsh development bank that provides financial support for Welsh businesses and is owned by the Welsh Government. The bank provides loans for businesses to start up, strengthen and grow and also provides equity investments for already established businesses.

Services 
The Group manages funds in excess of £1.4 billion and consists of the fund managers Development Bank of Wales and FW Capital, which invest in SMEs as well as Angels Invest Wales, a business angel network.

The Development Bank of Wales Group can make debt, mezzanine and equity investments of up to £10 million at all stages (early stage, development capital, as well as succession and acquisition) and also structures follow-on investments for its portfolio. The Group also syndicates/co-invests.

Development Bank of Wales has four offices across Wales - Wrexham, Cardiff, Llanelli and St Asaph.

In October 2017 the Development Bank of Wales was launched replacing its predecessor Finance Wales (2001 - 2017).

In 2018 Economic Intelligence Wales launched as part of the Development Bank of Wales Group. A collaboration between Cardiff University, the Office of National Statistics and the Development Bank of Wales, Economic Intelligence Wales collates and analyses data to create independent, robust and reliable insight to help better understand and improve the Welsh economy.

External links
Development Bank of Wales
FW Capital
Angels Invest Wales
Economic Intelligence Wales

References 

Financial services companies of Wales
Wrexham
Companies based in Cardiff
Banks of Wales